Awlad Hassan  is an ethnic group of Sudan. It is an Arabic-speaking minority. The number of persons in this group exceeds 50,000. Most members of this group are Muslims.

As described in the book "The Arab Conquest of the Western Sahara", for centuries after the first Arabs passed through North Africa, the presence of Arabic culture in the Western Sahara was limited to scholars and mystics. Then, in the Middle Ages, came a small band of Yemeni tradesmen who came to dominate the desert trade routes. Their descendants, the Awlad Hassan, imposed themselves on the native Berbers, introducing a new society, language and religion.

References

Ethnic groups in Sudan